Hans Brügelmann (born 1946) is a German professor of pedagogy.

From 1971 until 1973 he has been assistant to the committee "strategies for curriculum reform" at the commission "Deutscher Bildungsrat," a commission for educational planning of the German federal and state governments.
Before and after his conferral of a doctorate in 1975, he worked on several evaluation projects from preschool to college.
In 1980 he was appointed to a professorship at the University of Bremen;
in 1993 he was appointed professor for primary school pedagogics and didactics at the University of Siegen.

External links 
Homepage an der Uni Siegen

German educational theorists
20th-century educational theorists
Academic staff of the University of Bremen
Academic staff of the University of Siegen
1946 births
Living people